Grin or Hryn (Ukrainian variant) is the surname of the following people
 Alexander Grin (1880–1932), Russian novelist
Elda Grin, Armenian writer, psychologist and legal expert
 François Grin (born 1959), Swiss economist
Serhiy Hryn (footballer) (born 1994), Ukrainian footballer
Serhiy Hryn (rower) (born 1981), Ukrainian rower